HFC Bank has several meanings including:

 HSBC Finance - A financial services company and a member of the HSBC Group. 
 Home Finance Company - A commercial bank in Ghana.